Ronald R. Gonzales (born 1951) is an American politician and member of the Democratic Party, who served as the 63rd Mayor of San Jose, California. Gonzales was the first Hispanic to serve as Mayor of San Jose since 1845.

Early life 
Gonzales grew up in the Santa Clara Valley, and graduated from the University of California, Santa Cruz.

Early political career
Gonzales served as a two-time mayor and member of the Sunnyvale City Council from 1979 to 1987. He completed the Mayor's Leadership Program at Harvard Kennedy School and is an American Leadership Forum fellow.

After his first two-terms as mayor, he then served for eight years (1989–1996) on the Santa Clara County Board of Supervisors.

Mid political career
In 1998, Gonzales was elected Mayor of San Jose, being sworn in during 1999.

Early in his first term, Gonzales began new programs. He designed a program to attract young teachers to the city's schools, including home purchase assistance programs.  He advocated using San Jose Redevelopment Agency funds in areas outside Downtown, including the King and Story neighborhood.

Gonzales pushed for BART to extend to Downtown San Jose, in the Silicon Valley BART extension. When San Jose's first BART station, Berryessa/North San José station, opened, many officials credited Gonzales with bringing this project to fruition.

Latino political revolution
Ron Gonzales was the first Latino Mayor of San Jose since California's Statehood. As San Jose is a major metropolitan region, that made Gonzales one of the first Hispanic mayors of a major U.S. city. He is listed among the nation's "Most influential Hispanics". When he addressed the 2000 Democratic National Convention in Los Angeles, Mayor Gonzales launched into an impassioned speech extolling the virtues of California's famed "Silicon Valley."

Gonzales came under frequent political attacks during the transitional years as San Jose politics moved left. As a single prominent Latino politician, he formed an easy target for dog whistle attacks tuned for a white voting constituency.

In 2000, a political spectacle was made out of Gonzales' personal life, which culminated in the politicized news of a separation from his wife and a relationship with a staffer, Guiselle Nunez, whom he married.

With his marriage already a public spectacle, in 2003, Gonzales came under political attack for negotiating a raise for sanitation workers. The issue revolved around  a nine-percent, $11 million ($2000), increase for Norcal Waste Systems, Inc., that Gonzales advocated the San Jose City Council adopt. Which the Council did. Gonzalez's political distractors framed the negotiation through a Santa Clara County Civil Grand Jury as an illegal quid pro quo to the Teamsters workers, which were part of Gonzales' labor political base. In a dramatic turn, fellow councilman Dave Cortese demanded Gonzales's resignation while member Chuck Reed began proceedings to remove Gonzales from his office as mayor. Eventually, the Council voted to censure Gonzales, but took no further actions. When the issue came before a judge, all charges were thrown out, on the basis that the prosecution's claims were novel as a matter of law, and even if true, did not amount to illegal activity. In the court's opinion, the judge wrote "This is not bribery, this is politics."
 
In 2002, Gonzales created the Silicon Valley Leadership PAC  and started collecting donations for this fund. With the above noted sanitation political fight ongoing and suffering a stroke in January, in March 2004, Gonzales announced he would stop collecting donations because of controversy about the fund.

Late political career
Gonzales was reelected as mayor in the March 2002 election. His second, and final, term as San Jose mayor ended in 2006. On January 28, 2004, while delivering the State of the City address, Gonzales suffered a stroke.  He returned to his duties on February 16 of that year. Gonzales stayed out of the race to succeed him and did not endorse or campaign for either candidate running in the November 2006 run-off election. The winner was Chuck Reed, who won a clear majority of the votes over the vice-Mayor of San Jose, Cindy Chavez.

Career 
After leaving the Santa Clara County Board of Supervisors due to term limits, Gonzales was an executive at Hewlett-Packard. Gonzales worked as Program Manager for ten years at Hewlett-Packard where he led a national initiative to create partnerships with local school districts and universities.

Honors 
Gonzales received the Community Impact Award in June 1999 from the Asian Law Alliance, as well as the Point of Light Award, a national honor given to individuals who have made significant contributions to their community. Gonzales founded of The Role Model Program, an effort that recruits adult role models to visit local middle schools . He also chairs the National League of Cities Youth, Education, and Families Council overseeing the League's policies related to the betterment of youth and families across the country , and was a founding board member of Downtown College Prep, Santa Clara County's first charter high school, which focuses on the academic success of high school students from the San Jose central city area.

References

External links
Official biography
KPIX story about the stroke
Metro's story breaking his office romance
Gonzales and his golfing pals
San Jose Inside

1951 births
County supervisors in California
California Democrats
Mayors of San Jose, California
Living people
American politicians of Mexican descent
University of California, Santa Cruz alumni
Harvard Kennedy School alumni
Hispanic and Latino American mayors in California